O Carteiro is a 2011 Brazilian drama film written and directed by Reginaldo Faria.

Plot
Victor (Campos Faria) is a postman in the countryside of Rio Grande do Sul and has a habit of violating the correspondence of its residents. One day, to his surprise, he falls into his own trap and falls in love with a new resident of the city, the young Merli (Ana Carolina Machado), who exchanges letters with her boyfriend. Victor begins to track the correspondence between them and stops interfering in the relationship of the couple.

References

External links

2011 films
Brazilian drama films
2011 drama films
2010s Portuguese-language films